Firearms Act is a stock short title used for legislation in Canada, Hong Kong, Jamaica, and the United Kingdom. This list includes not only Firearms Acts as such, but legislation of different names governing firearms and also other weapons.

List

Canada
Firearms Act

Finland
The Firearms Act 1998

Hong Kong
The Firearms and Ammunition Ordinance 1981

Jamaica
Firearms Act (Jamaica)

United Kingdom
Many laws governing possession and use of firearms have been passed over the years in the UK and the countries comprising the union; there is a historical discussion at Gun politics in the United Kingdom#Gun control legislation in the United Kingdom
The English Assizes of Arms of 1181 and 1252 governed arms, but predated firearms
The 1508 act forbidding the use of guns or crossbows without Royal Letters Patent
The 1515 "Acte Avoidyng Shoting in Crossebowes and Gonnes"
The 1542 Act introducing hunting licenses
The 1549 Act forbidding the shooting of birdshot
The 1663 Act for Ordering the Forces in the several Counties of the Kingdom 
The Bill of Rights 1689, England
The Disarming Acts of 1716 and 1725, Great Britain Act applicable explicitly to the Highlands of Scotland
The Act of Proscription 1746, essentially a restatement with harsher penalties of the Disarming Acts
The Vagrancy Act 1824 providing power to arrest "...  armed with any Gun, Pistol, Hanger, Cutlass, Bludgeon, or other offensive Weapon, or having upon him or her any Instrument, with Intent to commit any felonious Act;"
The Night Poaching Act 1828
The Game Act 1831
The Night Poaching Act 1844
The Poaching Prevention Act 1862
The Gun Licence Act (1870)
The Pistols Act 1903
The Firearms Act 1920 (10 & 11 Geo 5 c 43)
The Firearms and Imitation Firearms (Criminal Use) Act 1933 (23 & 24 Geo 5 c 50)
The Firearms Act 1934 (24 & 25 Geo 5 c 16)
The Firearms (Amendment) Act 1936 (26 Geo 5 & 1 Edw 8 c 39) 
The Firearms Act 1937 (1 Edw 8 & 1 Geo 6 c 12)
The Firearms Act 1965 (c 44)
The Firearms Act 1968
The Firearms Act 1969
The Firearms (Dangerous Air Weapons) Rules 1969
The Firearms Act 1982
The Crossbows Act 1987
The Criminal Justice (Firearms)(Northern Ireland) Order 1988
The Firearms (Amendment) Act 1988
The Firearms Rules 1989
The Firearms Act (Amendment) Regulations 1992
The Firearms (Amendment) Act 1992
The Firearms (Amendment) Act 1993
The Firearms (Dangerous Air Weapons) (Amendment) Rules 1993
The Firearms (Amendment) Act 1994
The Firearms (Amendment) Act 1997
The Firearms (Amendment) (No. 2) Act 1997
The Firearms (Museums) Order 1997
The Firearms Rules 1998
Criminal Justice Act 2003
The Firearms (Northern Ireland) Commencement Order 2004
Firearms (Appeals and Applications) Regulations (Northern Ireland) 2005
The Firearms (Amendment) (Northern Ireland) Order 2005
The Firearms (Amendment) Rules 2005
The Violent Crime Reduction Act 2006 Part 2
The Firearms (Amendment) Regulations 2010
The Firearms (Amendment) (No. 2) Rules 2013
The Firearms (Amendment) Rules 2013
The Firearms Regulations 2015

The Firearms Acts 1937 and 1965 was the collective title of the Firearms Act 1937 and the Firearms Act 1965.

See also
The Weapons Act 1990, Queensland, Australia
German Weapons Act
The Arms Act 1959, India
The Arms Act 1983, New Zealand
The Roberti-Roos Assault Weapons Control Act of 1989, California, USA
Gun laws in the Czech Republic

References

List of short titles

Lists of legislation by short title